Bernard Beuken is a Belgian former footballer who played as a defender.

References

Living people
Association football defenders
Belgian footballers
Belgian expatriate footballers
Allsvenskan players
Standard Liège players
Cercle Brugge K.S.V. players
Malmö FF players
Expatriate footballers in Sweden
1971 births